Bogdanov (Богданов) or Bogdanova (Богданова; feminine) is a common Russian surname that derives from the given name Bogdan and literally means Bogdan's. Translated: Bogu dan = God gave. Notable people with the surname include:

Bogdanov
Abraham Bogdanove (1888–1946) Russian muralist, artist and educator
Alexei Alexeivich Bogdanov (1907–1971), Soviet geologist
Andrei Ivanovich Bogdanov (1692–1766), Russian bibliographer and ethnographer
Igor and Grichka Bogdanoff (1949–2021/2022), French TV hosts and twin brothers, notable for the Bogdanov affair and numerous internet memes
Ivan Bogdanov (1897–1942), Soviet military officer
Ivan Bogdanov (painter) (1855–1932), Russian painter
Malachi Bogdanov, British theatre director
Michael Bogdanov (1938–2017), British theatre director
Mikhail Aleksandrovich Bogdanov (1914–1995), Soviet production designer
Nikolay Bogdanov-Belsky (1868–1945), Russian painter
Semen llyich Bogdanov (1894–1960), Soviet military officer, Hero of the Soviet Union
Vladimir Leonidovich Bogdanov (born 1951), Russian oil tycoon
Jon Bogdanove (Born 1958), American artist

Science
Alexander Bogdanov (1873–1928), Belarusian-Russian physician, philosopher, economist, writer and revolutionary
Anatoli Petrovich Bogdanov (1834–1896), Russian zoologist and anthropologist
Bogdan Bogdanov (1940–2016), Bulgarian classical philologist, culturologist and translator
Konstantin Bogdanov, Russian anthropologist and philologist
Modest Bogdanov (1841–1888), Russian zoologist
Rifkat Bogdanov (1950–2013), Tatar-Russian mathematician

Politics
Andrei Vladimirovich Bogdanov, (born 1970), Russian politician
Boris Bogdanov, menshevik revolutionary

Sport
Anatoli Bogdanov (born 1981), Russian footballer
Anatoli Ivanovich Bogdanov (1931–2001), Soviet sport shooter
Andrei Bogdanov, swimmer
Eduard Bogdanov (born 1968), Russian football player and coach
Galin Bogdanov (born 1990), Bulgarian football player
Lyubomir Bogdanov (born 1982), Bulgarian football player
Maksims Bogdanovs (born 1989), Latvian motorcycle speedway rider
Petar Bogdanov, Bulgarian high jumper
Sergei Dmitriyevich Bogdanov (born 1977), Russian footballer
Valeri Bogdanov (footballer, born 1952), Russian football player and coach
Valeri Bogdanov (footballer, born 1966), Russian football player

Bogdanova
Anna Bogdanova (born 1984), Russian heptathlete
Krasimira Bogdanova, Bulgarian basketball player
Ludmila Bogdanova, penname of Belarusian writer Rakitina Nika (born 1963)
Lyudmila Bogdanova, Russian judoka
 (1836–1897), Russian dancer with an international career, prima ballerina of Paris Opera and Bolshoi Theatre.   
Olga Bogdanova (born 1994), Estonian rhythmic gymnast 
Svetlana Bogdanova (handballer) (born 1964), Russian handball player
Svetlana Bogdanova (water polo) (born 1976), Russian water polo player
Yuliya Bogdanova, Soviet swimmer
Viktoria Bogdanova (born 1994), Estonian rhythmic gymnast 
Glikeriya Vasilievna Bogdanova-Chesnokova (1904–1983), Soviet theatre and film actress

See also
Bogdan
Bogdani

References

Russian-language surnames
Bulgarian-language surnames
Theophoric names
Patronymic surnames